Pakistan Fashion Week (PFW) is a fashion event annually held in Karachi, Pakistan. The event is organised by the Fashion Pakistan Council (FPC) an organisation based in Karachi. The FPW was first launched in 2009 in Marriott Hotels, Karachi.
fashion week Pakistan 
https://ahmadbeautyblogs.blogspot.com/2022/10/fashion-week-pakistan.html

2012 
FPW's fourth edition was held in September 2012 in Karachi. The event was held for three days with a great showings of fashion designers from all around the Pakistan.

2013 
FPW 5 was scheduled to be held on March 20–22, 2013, a three days event will present thirty designers from all over the Pakistan. But due to the Abbas Town tragedy, FPC's CEO and a designer Maheen Khan postponed to April 2013. The 3-day event was held on April 9, 2013. Fashion Pakistan Week 2017 featured Khas Stores, Emran Rajput, Baani D and Maheen Khan on the first day.

2014
FPW Autumn/Winter 2014 was held from November 25–27 in Karachi. Mohsin Ali, Nauman Arfeenshowing, Ather Ali Hafeez for Sana Safinaz,  Ishtiaq Afzal Khan's "Aurora," Nida Azwer, Shehla Chatoor, Deepak and Fahad, Ayesha Farooq Hashwani, Maheen Karim, Maheen Khan, Levi's, Sadaf Malaterre, and Faraz Mannan were among those showing at the event.

References

External links 
  of Fashion Pakistan

Fashion events in Pakistan
Annual events in Pakistan
Recurring events established in 2009
2009 establishments in Pakistan
Fashion weeks